

Tests conducted by AQSIQ
results published on 16 September 2008
Source: China Central Television

results published on 30 September 2008
Source: Administration of Quality Supervision, Inspection and Quarantine

Tests conducted by the Hong Kong Centre for Food Safety
Results published up to 25 October 2008
Source: Hong Kong Centre for Food Safety

Tests conducted by Agri-Food and Veterinary Authority of Singapore
Results published up to 24 October 2008
Source: Agri-Food and Veterinary Authority of Singapore

Tests conducted by Macao Health Bureau
Results published up to 30 September 2008 by the Serviço de Saude de Macao (SSM)
Source: Xinhua, Macau Daily Times

Tests conducted by the Food and Consumer Product Safety Authority of the Netherlands
Results published up to 30 September 2008 by the Voedsel en Waren Autoriteit
Source: Voedsel en Waren Autoriteit

Tests conducted by Indonesian Agency for Drugs and Food 
Results published up to 27 September 2008 by the National Agency of Drug and Food Control of Republic of Indonesia (NADFC)
Source: Department of Health, Indonesia

Tests conducted by New Zealand Food Safety Authority 
Results published up to 7 October 2008 by the NZFSA
Source: New Zealand Food Safety Authority

Test conducted by Institute of Hygiene and Public Health, Ho Chi Minh city
Results published up to 6 October 2008.

Source: Ho Chi Minh city Department of Health, Tuoi Tre Newspaper

References

Test failures of the 2008 Chinese milk scandal, Official
Milk scandal, Official test failures of the 2008 Chinese